Hervé Matthys (born 19 January 1996) is a Belgian footballer who plays as a centre back for Beerschot.

Club career
Matthys joined Anderlecht in 2012 from Club Brugge. He made his first team debut on 3 December 2014 in the Belgian Cup against Mechelen replacing Frank Acheampong at half-time in a 4–1 home win.

On 2 September 2021, he joined ADO Den Haag on a one-year contract.

On 10 April 2022, Matthys signed a two-year contract with Beerschot.

References

External links

Living people
1996 births
Footballers from Bruges
Association football defenders
Belgian footballers
Belgium youth international footballers
R.S.C. Anderlecht players
K.V.C. Westerlo players
FC Eindhoven players
Excelsior Rotterdam players
ADO Den Haag players
K Beerschot VA players
Belgian Pro League players
Eredivisie players
Eerste Divisie players
Belgian expatriate footballers
Expatriate footballers in the Netherlands
Belgian expatriate sportspeople in the Netherlands